Chrysoteuchia deltella is a moth in the family Crambidae. It was described by Shi-Mei Song and Tie-Mei Chen in 2001. It is found in Heilongjiang, China.

References

Crambini
Moths described in 2001
Moths of Asia